Belize Airways Limited was Belize's first and only national airline. The carrier began flights from Belize International Airport (now Philip S. W. Goldson International Airport) on October 1, 1977. In 1980, the airline declared bankruptcy. Its final flight was in January 1980.

Destinations
Belize Airways offered scheduled passenger flights between Belize City and Miami, San Pedro Sula, San Salvador and La Ceiba at various times during its existence.

Aircraft

According to Belize Airways timetables, the airline operated Boeing 720 and stretched British Aircraft Corporation BAC One-Eleven series 500 jetliners at various times during its existence.

References

Defunct airlines of Central America
Airlines established in 1976
Airlines disestablished in 1980